Salt of the Sound is a Christian music band composed of husband-and-wife duo Anita and Ben Tatlow and is currently based in Hong Kong. The band has released three albums and six EPs. Their sound has been described as "evocative", "atmospheric", and "reflective".

Recordings

The duo's debut album Journeys was released in November 2013 and immediately found favour with eminent Christian music publications, including Cross Rhythms.

Their second collection of original music, Through The Mist, was released on September 16, 2014.

Discography

Studio albums
 Journeys (2013)
 Echoes of Wonder (2015)
 Beyond Here (2018)
 Made Whole (2021)

EPs
 Through the Mist (2014)
 From the Steepest Slopes (2016)
 Waiting for the Dawn (2016)
 In Prayer (2017)
 Lent, Vol. 1 (2018)
 And on Earth, Peace (2019)
 Lent, Vol. 2 (2021)
 Hymns for Eventide (2021)

Compilations 
 Meditations, Vol. 1 (2014)
 Meditations, Vol. 2 (2016)
 Meditations, Vol. 3 (2018)
 Meditations, Vol. 4 (2020)

References

External links
Official Website
 
Interview with Salt Of The Sound on Cross Rhythms

Christian musical groups
Ambient music groups
Electronic music duos